Izatha heroica is a moth of the family Oecophoridae. It is endemic to New Zealand, where it is widespread in the west part of the South Island. It has been collected in southern beech forests but larvae have been reared on dead kanuka or manuka bushes.

Taxonomy 

This species was first described by Alfred Philpott in 1926 using a female specimen taken at Flora River, Mount Arthur in January. The holotype specimen is held at the New Zealand Arthropod Collection. Later that year Charles E. Clarke, thinking he was describing a new species, discussed and named the species Izatha toreuma. Clarke used a male specimen obtained from Arthurs Pass in January. This specimen is held at the Auckland War Memorial Museum. This name was synonymised by George Hudson in 1928.

Description 
Philpott described the female of the species as follows:

The wingspan is 23–29 mm for males and 27–32 mm for females. Adults have been recorded in January, February and early March. This species can be distinguished from similar species by its larger size, its greyish coloured forewing and the absence of a conical process on the top of the head.

Distribution 
I. heroica is endemic to New Zealand and can only be found in the South Island. Although the species prefers the west side of the Island it has been collected in Nelson, Marlborough, Marlborough Sounds, Westland, Fiordland, North Canterbury, Buller, Otago Lakes, Central Otago, and Southland.

Behaviour and life cycle 
This species is attracted to light.

Habitat and host plants 

This species has been found in wetter forests of the western South Island including Nothofagus forest. Larvae have been reared from erect dead Leptospermum. The host may have been Kunzea ericoides or Leptospermum scoparium, since both were placed in the genus Leptospermum at this time. This rearing record has led to the hypothesis that the species is not dependent on beech forest for its survival.

References

Oecophorinae
Moths described in 1926
Endemic fauna of New Zealand
Moths of New Zealand
Endemic moths of New Zealand